The 84th edition of the KNVB Cup (at the time called Amstel Cup) started on 4 August 2001. The final was played on 12 May 2002: Ajax beat Utrecht 3–2 and received the cup for the fifteenth time. A total of 86 clubs participated.

Teams
 All 18 participants of the Eredivisie 2001-02: six teams entered in the round of 16 of the knock-out stage; two in the first round of the knock-out stage and the rest in the group stage.
 All 18 participants of the Eerste Divisie 2001-02
 48 teams from lower (amateur) leagues
 Two reserve teams

Group stage
The matches of the group stage were played between August 4 and 22 2001. 78 teams played a total of 114 matches, 38 teams progressed to the next round.

E Eredivisie; 1 Eerste Divisie; A Amateur teams

Knock-out phase

First round
The matches of the first round were played on 18-20 September 2001. sc Heerenveen and RKC Waalwijk entered the tournament this round. During the group stage, they were still active in the Intertoto Cup.

E two Eredivisie entrants

Second round
The matches of the second round were played between 23 October and 6 November 2001.

Round of 16
The matches of the round of 16 were played on 11-12 December 2001. The six Eredivisie teams that had been playing in European competitions after qualification last season, entered the tournament this round.

E six Eredivisie entrants

Quarter-finals
The matches of the quarter finals were played on 31 January 31 and 7 February 2002.

Semi-finals
The matches of the semi-finals were played on 29 March and 10 April 2002.

Final

Ajax was granted a life line by a late offside goal by Wamberto sending the game into extra time, the linesman later admitting the mistake saying he had a black out. Ajax also won the Dutch Eredivisie championship, thereby taking the double. They would participate in the Champions League, so finalists FC Utrecht could play in the UEFA Cup.

See also
Eredivisie 2001-02
Eerste Divisie 2001-02
Sparta Rotterdam season 2001–02

External links
 Results by Ronald Zwiers  

2001-02
2001–02 domestic association football cups
2001–02 in Dutch football